The Eaton–Prescott House  is a historic house at 284 Summer Avenue in Reading, Massachusetts.  Its oldest portion was probably built before 1757.  By that year it had acquired a leanto section, since removed or incorporated into the main structure of the house.  It is now a principally Georgian style house, although its door surround dates to the Greek Revival period of the 1830s-1840s.  The house stands on land that was in the Eaton family as far back as the late 17th century.

The house remained in the same family until the last local descendant of the Prescotts died in 1902. Circa 1907 the house was purchased by local architect Willard P. Adden, who restored and renovated it for use as his family home. He moved out of the house circa 1916.

The house was listed on the National Register of Historic Places in 1984.

See also
National Register of Historic Places listings in Reading, Massachusetts
National Register of Historic Places listings in Middlesex County, Massachusetts

References

Houses completed in 1757
Houses on the National Register of Historic Places in Reading, Massachusetts
Houses in Reading, Massachusetts
1757 establishments in Massachusetts